This article presents a list of the historical events and publications of Australian literature during 1906.

Books 
 Guy Boothby – The Race of Life
 Ada Cambridge – A Happy Marriage
 Edward Dyson – In the Roaring Fifties
 Ambrose Pratt – The Counterstroke
 Ethel Turner – In the Mist of the Mountains
 Lilian Turner – Betty the Scribe

Short stories 
 Louis Becke – Sketches from Normandy
 Guy Boothby – A Royal Affair and Other Stories
 Edward Dyson – Fact'ry 'Ands
 Mabel Forrest – "The Housekeeper"
 Steele Rudd – Back to Our Selection
 Thos. E. Spencer – The Surprising Adventures of Mrs. Bridget McSweeney

Poetry 

 Arthur H. Adams – London Streets
 Ada Cambridge – "Good-Bye"
 C. J. Dennis
 "Cow"
 "Weary"
 Louis Esson – "Brogan's Lane"
 George Essex Evans – The Secret Key and Other Verses
 Mabel Forrest – "The Circus Lion"
 Henry Lawson
 "The Bard of Furthest Out"
 "To Victor Daley"
 Louisa Lawson 
 "The Old Brown Hen"
 "They Are Taking the Old Piano"
 Will Lawson – Between the Lights and Other Verses
 Dorothy Frances McCrae – "Homesick"
 Hugh McCrae – "A Bridal Song"
 Bernard O'Dowd – The Silent Land and Other Verses
 A. B. Paterson – "Santa Claus in the Bush"
 Thos. E. Spencer – How M'Dougall Topped the Score and Other Verses and Sketches

Births 

A list, ordered by date of birth (and, if the date is either unspecified or repeated, ordered alphabetically by surname) of births in 1906 of Australian literary figures, authors of written works or literature-related individuals follows, including year of death.

 14 March – R. Wilkes Hunter, novelist (died 1991)
 11 April – Cyril Pearl, journalist and humorist (died 1987)
 30 April – Philip Lindsay, historical novelist (died 1958)
 10 May – R. G. Howarth, poet and critic (died 1974)
Unknown date

 Mary Finnin, artist, art teacher and poet (died 1992)

Deaths 

A list, ordered by date of death (and, if the date is either unspecified or repeated, ordered alphabetically by surname) of deaths in 1906 of Australian literary figures, authors of written works or literature-related individuals follows, including year of birth.

 6 February – James Bonwick, novelist and historian (born 1817)

See also 
 1906 in poetry
 List of years in literature
 List of years in Australian literature
1906 in literature
1905 in Australian literature
1906 in Australia
1907 in Australian literature

References

Literature
Australian literature by year
20th-century Australian literature